Sadbarkaly is a union council of Lower Dir District in Khyber Pakhtunkhwa, Pakistan.

Lower Dir District has 37 union councils with a population of 797,852, according to the 1998 census report. The  population growth rate of the Lower Dir District was 3.42% per annum between the 1981 and 1998 censuses.

See also 

 Lower Dir District

External links
Khyber-Pakhtunkhwa Government website section on Lower Dir
United Nations

Lower Dir District
Union Councils of Lower Dir District
Union councils of Khyber Pakhtunkhwa